Pradosia is a genus of plants in the family Sapotaceae described as a genus in 1872.

Most of the species of Pradosia are native to Central and South America, but a few occur in Trinidad and in tropical Africa.

Species
 †Pradosia argentea (Kunth) T.D.Penn. – Peru
 Pradosia atroviolacea Ducke – Costa Rica to Acre
 Pradosia beardii (Monach.) T.D.Penn. – Trinidad, Venezuela, Guyana
 Pradosia brevipes (Pierre) T.D.Penn. – Brazil, Paraguay
 Pradosia caracasana (Pittier) T.D.Penn – Trinidad, Venezuela, Colombia
 Pradosia cochlearia (Lecomte) T.D.Penn. – French Guiana, N Brazil
 Pradosia colombiana (Standl.) T.D.Penn. ex T.J.Ayers & Boufford – Venezuela, Colombia
 Pradosia cuatrecasasii (Aubrév.) T.D.Penn. – Colombia
 Pradosia decipiens Ducke – Amazonas
 †Pradosia glaziovii (Pierre) T.D.Penn. – Rio de Janeiro
 Pradosia granulosa Pires & T.D.Penn. – Pará, Maranhão
 Pradosia grisebachii (Pierre) T.D.Penn. – Trinidad, Venezuela
 Pradosia huberi (Ducke) Ducke – French Guiana, Pará
 Pradosia kuhlmannii Toledo – Rio de Janeiro
 Pradosia lactescens (Vell.) Radlk. – Brazil
 Pradosia lahoziana Terra-Araujo – Amazonas
 Pradosia longipedicellata Alves-Araújo & M.Alves – Bahia
 Pradosia montana T.D.Penn. – Ecuador
 †Pradosia mutisii Cronquist – Colombia, Ecuador
 Pradosia ptychandra (Eyma) T.D.Penn. – Suriname, French Guiana
 Pradosia schomburgkiana (A.DC.) Cronquist – Northern South America
 Pradosia spinosa Ewango & Breteler – Cameroon, Republic of the Congo, Gabon, Democratic Republic of the Congo
 Pradosia subverticillata Ducke – Amazonas, Pará
 Pradosia surinamensis (Eyma) T.D.Penn. – Venezuela, Guianas, Northern Brazil
 Pradosia verrucosa Ducke – Pernambuco
 Pradosia verticillata Ducke – Amazonas, French Guiana

References

 
Sapotaceae genera
Taxonomy articles created by Polbot